Aumann is a surname. Notable people with the surname include:

Franz Joseph Aumann, (1728-1797), Austrian composer
 Georg Aumann (1906–1980), German mathematician
Raimond Aumann (born 1963), German footballer
Robert Aumann (born 1930), Israeli mathematician
Aumann's agreement theorem
Susan L. M. Aumann (born 1960), Maryland politician

See also
Auman

German-language surnames